Paleri Manikyam: Oru Pathirakolapathakathinte Katha is a 2009 Indian Malayalam-language mystery film written and directed by Ranjith, starring Mammootty, Shwetha Menon and Mythili. It is based on the novel of the same name by T. P. Rajeevan, which said the true story of the first recorded murder case in Kerala. Mammooty plays three characters in the film. The film was Mythili's debut in cinema. Ranjith also introduced about thirty Malayalam stage artists through this film. The film tells the story of a private detective, who returns to his birthplace, a village called Paleri, to solve a murder mystery that occurred on the same night he was born. Upon the release of the movie, it got an 'A' certificate due to its violent and adult content.

The film won four Kerala State Film Awards including the Best Film Award. Mammootty won his fifth Kerala State Film Award for Best Actor for playing three roles Ahmed Haji, Haridas, and Khalid Ahmed in this movie. Shweta Menon also won her first Kerala State Film Award for Best Actress for this film.

Plot
The story revolves around the unnatural death of a young woman named Manikyam in Paleri, a small village in northern Kerala, in the late 1950s. Although it was claimed by her in-laws that she died after she had a seizure, examination of the body revealed it to be a case of murder and rape. The police charged three locals with the murder, only to be released by the court which described the prosecution's case as flawed. With no further investigation, the case had, since then, gone cold over the years, eventually acquiring the status of an unsolved mystery.

Around 52 years later, Haridas, a detective living in New Delhi, sets out on a journey to Paleri hoping to solve this mystery. Apparently, he was born in the same village on the same night when Manikyam was killed. He is joined by Sarayu, a crime analyst.

Most of the clues and knowledge of Balan Nair and Keshavan lead him to zero in on Ahmed Haji, a cruel feudal landlord who lived in Paleri during that period. It was obvious why his name did not figure in police reports from that era; he was so powerful and influential in Paleri at that time. Slowly, as things become clear, Haridas deduces that the murderer is Khalid Ahmed, Haji's first wife's eldest son.

Cast
Mammootty plays three roles in the film, namely
 Haridas, a private detective in New Delhi
 Murikkinkunnath Ahmed Haaji, a wicked feudal landlord of ancient Paleri who had a dangerous sex drive
 Khalid Ahmed, an elderly scholar who is Haji's eldest son 
 Mythili as Manikyam
 Shweta Menon as Cheeru (voice by Zeenath)
 Gowri Munjal as Sarayu
 Sreenivasan as Keshavan 
Musthafa as young Keshavan
 Siddique as Balan, a present-day native
 Vijayan V. Nair as Velayudhan
 T. Damodaran as K. P. Hamsa
 Suresh Krishna as DySP Y. Madhavan
 Sasi Kalinga as DySP Mohandas Manalath, the old day cop
 Sreejith as Pokkan
 T. A. Razzaq as a Ghazal Singer (Guest appearance)

Production
The novel, titled Paleri Manikyam: Oru Pathirakolapathakathinte Katha itself, was written by director Ranjith's friend T. P. Rajeevan and was published in the Mathrubhumi Weekly a year before onwards. The novel was based on the true story of Manikyam, who was raped and murdered in the early 1950s. According to Rajeevan as well as the film crew, this was the first recorded crime in Kerala. Ranjith was amazed by the story and bought the rights from Rajeevan. Before getting the rights, he had discussed the story with actor Mammootty, who was optimistic about the film. They began the project by mid 2009 and most of the filming occurred on the hill side villages of Kozhikode.

The film was produced by A.V.Anoop in the banner of A. V. Productions and Maha Subair in the banner of Varnachithra Big Screen. It was distributed by Varnachithra Bigscreen Release.

Casting
The original cast included Mammootty to play all the three lead roles. Ranjith cast Shwetha Menon as Cheeru, an important character that required the potential of such an experienced actor. Ranjith introduced television anchor and model Mythili, who played the central character Manikyam in the film. Dhanya Mary Varghese was also approached for this role but she instantly rejected. Noted South Indian actress Gowri Munjal played the role of an associate and love of Haridas Ahmed, one of the characters played by Mammootty. Noted screenwriter T. Damodaran also played an important role in the film.

Ranjith, who is an alumnus of School of Drama, [Thrissur], also incorporated thirty experienced stage actors of Malayalam drama in this film. They were selected from five hundred odd theatre actors who auditioned for the film in Kozhikode. Actor Murali Menon was the casting director. Among the thirty two selected, Sreejith, Vijayan V. Nair and Musthafa were three who played major roles in the film. Sreejith, an amateur actor at Kaiveli, Kozhikode, who became famous through a reality show, played Pokkan, the husband of Manikyam and a lunatic. Musthafa played younger Keshavan, a character enacted by veteran Sreenivasan in the later stages. He was one of the finalists of a reality show telecast on Amrita TV, of which Ranjith was a judge. Vijayan V. Nair, played Velayudhan, henchman of Ahmed Haji, another character played by Mammootty. Though he has acted in telefilms and tele serials, this was his debut as an actor. "I had cast Vijayan as Velayudhan long ago. Murali Menon, who had groomed the theatre actors at the workshop, had told me about him some time ago. I was confident that he would be ideal for the powerful character of Velayudhan," says Ranjith, who is delighted that he has been able to give Malayalam cinema some exciting new talents.

Music
The original score and title track of the film was composed by Bijibal while the only song was composed by Sharreth, Ranjith's previous collaborator in Thirakkatha. The score as well as the songs received notably mixed responses. However, the main theme song enjoyed the status of a chartbuster, thanks for the well received plot of the movie. The lyrics were penned by Rafeeq Ahamed (Thum Jho) and T.P Rajeevan (title song).

Release
The film was released on 5 December 2009. It opened in forty centres in Kerala, which is half the number of usual superstar releases. It was also screened at the International Film Festival of India that year.

Reception
Nowrunning is all praise for the film and comments that "Ranjith's Manickyam is a rarity of a film that exceeds expectations and offers a psychedelic high for the viewer. There would be no surprise if it ignites some sort of a controversy for the boldness that it displays. For the discerning viewer though, this might perhaps be one of the best films to have come out this year." A review on Rediff.com commented that "Very rarely does a film satisfy our expectations. But director Ranjith's latest Malayalam film Paleri Manikyam: Oru Pathira Kolapathakathinte Katha does. The film is near perfect with minor ignorable blemishes." Sify called the movie "one of the finest films in Malayalam history" and commented that "Paleri Manikyam: Oru Pathira Kolapathakathinte Kadha is one film that will haunt you days after you've left the theatres. It's a gem that comes not too often and the least you can do to appreciate it is to watch it at the cinemas, at the earliest!"

Awards
 Kerala State Film Awards
 Best Film – A.V.Anoop and Maha Subair
 Best Actor – Mammootty
 Best Actress – Shweta Menon
 Best Makeup Artist – Ranjith Ambadi, S. George

Asianet Film Awards
 Best Director – Ranjith
 Millennium Actor – Mammootty
 Best Supporting Actor- Female – Swetha Menon

Vanitha Film Awards
 Best Director – Ranjith
 Best Actor – Mammootty
 Best Supporting Actress – Shweta Menon

Surya Film Awards
 Best Actor – Mammootty
 Best Actress – Shweta Menon
 Best Background Score – Bijibal
 Best Make-up – George

References

External links
 

2000s Malayalam-language films
Films based on Indian novels
Films scored by Sharreth
Films scored by Bijibal
2000s crime films
Indian crime films
Indian mystery films
Films directed by Ranjith
Films shot in Kozhikode
2000s mystery films